The Duchy of Modena and Reggio (Emilian: Duchêt ed Mòdna e Rèz) was an Italian state created in 1452 located in Northwestern Italy, in the present day region of Emilia-Romagna. It was ruled since its establishment by the noble House of Este, and since 1814 by the Austria-Este branch of the family. The Este dynasty was a great sponsor of the arts, making the Duchy a cultural reference during the Renaissance and Baroque periods.

House of Este
In 1452 Emperor Frederick III offered the duchy to Borso d'Este, whose family had ruled the city of Modena and nearby Reggio Emilia for centuries. Borso in 1450 had also succeeded his brother as margrave in the adjacent Papal Duchy of Ferrara, where he received the ducal title in 1471. The Este lands on the southern border of the Holy Roman Empire with the Papal States formed a stabilizing buffer state in the interest of both.

The first Este dukes ruled well and the city achieved an economic and cultural peak: Borso's successor Duke Ercole I had the city of Modena rebuilt according to plans designed by Biagio Rossetti, his successors were patrons of artists like Titian and Ludovico Ariosto. In the War of the League of Cambrai from 1508, troops from Modena fought in Papal service against the Republic of Venice. Upon the death of Duke Alfonso II in 1597, the ducal line became extinct. The Este lands were bequested to Alfonso's cousin Cesare d'Este; however, the succession was not acknowledged by Pope Clement VIII and Ferrara was finally seized by the Papacy. Cesare could retain Modena and Reggio as Imperial fiefs.

In the 1628 War of the Mantuan Succession, the dukes of Modena sided with Habsburg Spain and in turn received the town of Correggio from the hands of Emperor Ferdinand II. During the War of the Spanish Succession, Duke Rinaldo was ousted by French troops under Louis Joseph de Bourbon, he could not return until 1707. In 1711 the small Duchy of Mirandola was absorbed by the Este. His successor Francesco III backed France in the 1740 War of the Austrian Succession and was expelled by Habsburg forces, but his duchy was restored by the 1748 Treaty of Aix-la-Chapelle.
 
In 1796 Modena was again occupied by a French army under Napoleon Bonaparte, who deposed Duke Ercole III and created the Cispadane Republic out of his territory. By the 1801 Treaty of Lunéville, the last Este Duke was compensated with the Breisgau region of the former Further Austrian territories in southwestern Germany, and died in 1803. Following his death, the ducal title was inherited by his son-in-law, the Habsburg-Lorraine archduke Ferdinand of Austria, an uncle of Emperor Francis II.

House of Austria-Este
With the dissolution of the Napoleonic Kingdom of Italy in 1814, following the final fall of Emperor Napoleon I after the Battle of Waterloo,  Ferdinand's son, Francis IV, again assumed the rule as Duke of Modena under the domination of the Austrian Empire (1815). Soon after, he inherited the territories of Massa and Carrara from his mother. In the course of the Italian unification period in the 1830s-60s, the "Austria-Este" dukes were briefly ousted in the revolutions of 1831 and 1848, but soon returned.

During the Second Italian War of Independence (April to July 1859) following the Battle of Magenta, the last Duke Francis V was again forced to flee, this time permanently. In December, Modena joined with the Tuscany and the Parma to form the "United Provinces of Central Italy", which were annexed to the growing Kingdom of Sardinia-Piedmont in March 1860, which led the Italian unification movement, which further led to the proclamation of the Kingdom of Italy in 1861.

Provinces of the Duchy before the dissolution
 Modena (Duchy of Modena)
 Reggio (Duchy of Reggio)
 Guastalla
 Frignano
 Garfagnana
 Lunigiana
 Massa and Carrara (Duchy of Massa and Carrara)

Traditional titles 
The Duke of Modena was:
 Duke of Modena (Lord 1288, Duke 1452) and Reggio (nell'Emilia) (Lord 1289, Duke 1452)
 Duke of Ferrara (Lord 1264, Duke 1471–1597)
 Duke of La Mirandola (1710), Massa (1829) and Guastalla (1847)
 Prince of the Holy Roman Empire, Prince of Carpi (1525), Correggio (1659), San Martino in Rio (1752) and of Carrara and Lunigiana (1829),
 Marquis of Montecchio (1597, marquessate in 1569), of Scandiano (1645) and La Concordia (1710)
 Count palatine of Novellara (1737) and Bagnolo (1737), 
 Count of Jeno ed Avad (Hungary, 1726)
 Lord of Sassuolo (1373), San Martino in Spino (1710), Campogalliano (1752), Castellarano (1752), Rodeglia (1752), Ieno and San Cassiano

Knighthood orders 
The Duke of Modena, since Francis V, was Grand Master of the :
 Order of the Eagle of Este 
 Order of Seniority of Service (it)

Historical flags and coat of arms

See also
 List of Dukes of Ferrara and of Modena
 Historical states of Italy
Duchy of Ferrara

References

 
Italian states
Duchies of the Holy Roman Empire
History of Emilia-Romagna
Early Modern Italy
Modern history of Italy
 
Duchy of Modena and Reggio
Reggio Emilia
 
House of Habsburg-Lorraine
1450s establishments in the Holy Roman Empire
1452 establishments in Europe
15th-century establishments in Italy
1796 disestablishments in Italy
1814 establishments in Italy
1859 disestablishments in Italy
States and territories established in 1542
States and territories disestablished in 1796
States and territories established in 1814
States and territories disestablished in 1859